Molangur is a village in Karimnagar district, Telangana. It is 30 km from the town of Karimnagar. 

Villages in Karimnagar district